Disa Records is a privately owned record label based in San Nicolas de los Garza, Nuevo León, Mexico. Specializing in Spanish language recordings, the company's works are distributed in the United States by Universal Music Group.

Univision Music Group bought a 50% interest in the company in 2001. In July 2006, Disa Records sued its American distributor and co-owner Universal Music Group for using "heavy-handed legal tactics" to obstruct a promised full buy-out of Disa Records by Univision.

In May 2008, Universal Music Group bought Univision Music Group and combined it with its Latin genre to become Universal Music Latin Entertainment.

At the end of a phase of execution of the transfer agreements complicated by the acquisition of Univision by Universal Music Group, Germán Chavez Moreno recreated, in 2013, a record label called Discos Sabinas that works, initially,  in partnership with the artist representation company Remex Music and the music publisher Midas3 that are also owned by the Chavez family.

References

See also
 List of record labels

Mexican record labels
Latin American music record labels
Universal Music Latin Entertainment
Companies based in Monterrey